The Arizona transition zone is a diagonal northwest-by-southeast region across central Arizona. The region is a transition from the higher-elevation Colorado Plateau in Northeast Arizona and the Basin and Range region of lower-elevation deserts in the southwest and south.

Northwest Arizona transitions to the lower elevation Mojave Desert of southern California, Nevada and Utah, with an indicator species of Joshua trees and other species, and southwestwards regions of the Sonoran Desert, along the Lower Colorado River Valley; in Arizona's south, all of central and eastern desert Sonoran Desert regions merge southwards into Sonora Mexico. The transition zone includes the Mogollon Rim and the White Mountains and extends into western New Mexico.

In the Arizona ecoregion section, the Arizona transition zone is the major section of the EPA designated, Level III ecoregion, Arizona/New Mexico Mountains ecoregion. The other two outlier subregions to the transition zone in Arizona, are the Kaibab Plateau of the North Rim of the Grand Canyon, and associated ranges of the Chuska Mountains region of the northeast Arizona and northwest New Mexico.

Geography
The transition zone is dominated by the Mogollon Plateau at the southern edge of the Coconino Plateau of the Flagstaff region and the San Francisco volcanic field; the Mogollon Rim borders the plateau which extends from Oak Creek Canyon on the west, to the east at the highest elevations of Arizona in the central and western White Mountains.

List of mountain ranges of the Arizona transition zone
The Arizona transition zone map is similar to the yellow transition region shown above.

Central mountain ranges

 Black Hills (Yavapai County)
 Dripping Spring Mountains (for Dripping Spring Quartzite)
 Limestone Hills
 Mazatzal Mountains

 New River Mountains
 Sierra Ancha
 Superstition Mountains
 Usery Mountains

Western region ranges

 Aquarius Mountains
 Black Hills (Yavapai County)
 Black Mountains (Yavapai County)
 Bradshaw Mountains
 Cottonwood Mountains
 Date Creek Mountains
 Hieroglyphic Mountains
 Juniper Mountains
 McCloud Mountains

 Mohon Mountains
 Music Mountains
 Peacock Mountains
 Poachie Range
 (Alamo Lake, Aguila Valley)
 Santa Maria Mountains
 Sierra Prieta
 Sullivan Buttes
 Vulture Mountains
 Weaver Mountains

Eastern region ranges

 Big Lue Mountains
 Black Hills (Greenlee County)
 Blackjack Mountains, Arizona
 Gila Mountains (Graham County)
 Hayes Mountains
 Mescal Mountains
 Natanes Mountains

 Pinal Mountains
 Salt River Mountains (Gila County)
 Santa Teresa Mountains
 Sevenmile Mountains, Arizona
 Sierra Aguilada–(New Mexico)
 White Mountains–(central-southern regions)

See also
 Arizona
 List of regions of Arizona

References 

 

Geography of Arizona
.
Regions of Arizona